James Dean Waite (born April 15, 1969) is a Canadian professional ice hockey coach and former goaltender. He currently serves as the goaltending coach for the Chicago Blackhawks.

Playing career
Waite was born in Sherbrooke, Quebec. As a youth, he played in the 1981 and 1982 Quebec International Pee-Wee Hockey Tournaments with a minor ice hockey team from Sherbrooke.

Waite was one of the highest-rated goalies in the late 1980s and many scouts believed he had the potential to become a star. He was named the best goaltender at the 1988 World Junior Ice Hockey Championships and was also named to the tournament all-star team as Canada won the gold medal. He was selected by the Chicago Blackhawks in the 1987 NHL Entry Draft; the Blackhawks were already deep in goal with both Ed Belfour and Dominik Hašek (although Hasek could not come to North America without defecting at the time). While Waite received the bulk of the starts in the backup role to Belfour for Chicago, with Hasek playing just 25 games in 2 seasons, Waite did not exhibit strong skills and was later sent to the San Jose Sharks, and eventually the Phoenix Coyotes. After 2001, Waite played the rest of his career in Germany, playing six years for ERC Ingolstadt in the Deutsche Eishockey Liga and signed in January 2010 for Nürnberg Ice Tigers.

Personal life
Waite's brother, Stéphane, was the goaltending coach for the Montreal Canadiens. He previously served as the Blackhawks' goaltending coach from 2005 to 2009.

Career statistics

Regular season and playoffs

International

References

External links

1969 births
Living people
Anglophone Quebec people
Canadian ice hockey goaltenders
Chicago Blackhawks coaches
Chicago Blackhawks draft picks
Chicago Blackhawks players
Chicoutimi Saguenéens (QMJHL) players
ERC Ingolstadt players
Essen Mosquitoes players
Hershey Bears players
Ice hockey people from Quebec
Indianapolis Ice players
Iserlohn Roosters players
National Hockey League first-round draft picks
Phoenix Coyotes players
Saginaw Hawks players
San Jose Sharks players
Sportspeople from Sherbrooke
Springfield Falcons players
St. John's Maple Leafs players
Thomas Sabo Ice Tigers players
Utah Grizzlies (IHL) players
Canadian expatriate ice hockey players in Germany
Canadian ice hockey coaches
Stanley Cup champions